The Bugatti Type 41, better known as the Royale, is a large luxury car built from 1927 to 1933 with a 4.3 m (169.3 in) wheelbase and 6.4 m (21 ft) overall length. It weighs approximately 3,175 kg (7,000 lb) and uses a 12.763 litre (778 cu in) straight-eight engine. For comparison, against the Rolls-Royce Phantom VII (produced from 2003 to 2017), the Royale is about 20% longer, and more than 25% heavier. This makes the Royale one of the largest cars in the world. Furthermore, with the limited production run and the premium nature of the vehicle, it is also both one of the rarest and most expensive vehicles in the world.

Ettore Bugatti planned to build twenty-five of these cars and sell them to royalty as the most luxurious car ever, but even European royalty were not buying such things during the Great Depression, and Bugatti was able to sell only three of the seven made (six still exist, one destroyed in wreck). Still, the engines were re-used successfully in newly constructed high-speed railcars for the French National Railway (SNCF).

Design

Crafted by Ettore Bugatti, the Type 41 is said to have come about because he took exception to the comments of an English lady who compared his cars unfavourably with those of Rolls-Royce.

Engine
The engine build for the Royale had a displacement of 12.7 litres. It had 3 valves per cylinder (two inlet:one exhaust) driven by a centrally positioned single overhead camshaft. Three bearings and only a single custom carburettor was needed. The engine was based on an aero-engine design that had been designed for the French Air Ministry, but never produced in that configuration.

The engine block and cylinder head were cast in one unit. Grinding of the engine valves was a regular maintenance requirement, and removing the engine valves for grinding required removing and disassembling the large cast iron engine.

Chassis
The chassis was understandably substantial, with a conventional semi-elliptic leaf spring suspension arrangement at the front.  At the rear the forward-facing Bugatti quarter-elliptics were supplemented by a second set facing to the rear.

Strangely for the modern day observer, the aluminium clutch box was attached to the chassis - not to the engine - and the gearbox (also aluminium) was attached to the rear axle which meant it was part of the unsprung mass of the suspension. The clutch and gearbox were placed at odd locations   to reduce noise and increase comfort, a difficult problem in those days.  The transmission was mounted at the rear to offset the weight of the engine.

Massive brake shoes were mechanically operated via cable controls: the brakes were effective but without servo-assistance required significant muscle power from the driver.  The car's light alloy "Roue Royale" wheels measured  in diameter and were cast in one piece with the brake drums.

Controls
Reflecting some tradition-based fashions of the time, the driver was confronted by a series of knobs of whalebone, while the steering wheel was covered with walnut.

Performance
A road test performed in 1926 by W. F. Bradley at the request of Ettore Bugatti for the Autocar magazine proved how exquisite chassis construction allowed very good and balanced handling at speed, similar to smaller Bugatti sports cars, despite the car's weight and size.

All Royales were individually bodied. The radiator cap was a posed elephant, a sculpture by Ettore's brother Rembrandt Bugatti.

Production
In 1928, Ettore Bugatti asserted that "this year King Alfonso of Spain will receive his Royale", but the Spanish king was deposed without taking delivery of a Royale, and the first of the cars to find a customer was not delivered until 1932.  The Royale with a basic chassis price of $30,000, was launched just as the world economy began to deteriorate into the 1930s Great Depression. Six Royales were built between 1929 and 1933, with just three sold to external customers. Intended for royalty, none was eventually sold to any royals, and Bugatti even refused to sell one to King Zog of Albania, claiming that "the man's table manners are beyond belief!"

Six of seven production Royales still exist, as the prototype was destroyed in an accident in 1931, and each has a different body, some having been rebodied several times.

41100 - Coupé Napoleon

The first car is chassis number 41100, now known as the Coupé Napoleon.
It was used by Ettore Bugatti, and in his later life became his personal car. It remained in the family's possession, housed at their Ermenonville chateau, until financial difficulties forced its sale in 1963. It subsequently passed into the hands of the obsessive Bugatti collector Fritz Schlumpf.
It originally had a Packard body. It was rebodied by Parisian coach builder Weymann as a two-door fixed head coupe. The Weymann body was replaced after the car was crashed by Ettore Bugatti, who in 1930 or 1931 fell asleep at the wheel travelling home from Paris to Alsace, necessitating a major rebuild.
At various stages, it was also fitted with other bodies.
Bricked up with 41141 and 41150 during World War II at the home of the Bugatti family in Ermenonville, to avoid being commandeered by the Nazis.
Sold by L'Ebe Bugatti in the early 1960s to the brothers Schlumpf
Resides in the Musée National de l'Automobile de Mulhouse, alongside 41131 that the Schlumpf brothers had acquired from John Shakespeare.
The 2011 recreation claims to use the original chassis from this car, stating that a new chassis frame was used in the rebuild of 41100 after the crash.

41111 - Coupé de ville Binder

The second car built, but the first to find a customer, is chassis no.41111
Known as the Coupé de ville Binder
Sold in April 1932 to French clothing manufacturer  . Ettore's eldest son, Jean, fashioned for the car a dramatic two-seater open body with flamboyant, full-bodied wings and a dickey seat, but no headlamps. In this form it became known as the Royale Esders Roadster.
Purchased by the French politician Raymond Patenôtre, the car was rebodied in the Coupé de ville style by the coach builder Henri Binder. From this point onwards, known as the Coupé de ville Binder
Never delivered to the King of Romania due to World War II, it was hidden from the Nazis by storing it in the sewers of Paris
Briefly located in the United Kingdom after World War II, and was then acquired by Dudley C. Wilson of the US in 1954.   On his death in 1961 it passed to banker Mills B Lane of Atlanta before in 1964 taking up residence in The Harrah Collection at Reno, Nevada, bought at the then sensational price of $45,000 (approximately what the car had cost new).
Sold in 1986 to an American collector, home builder, and US Air Force Reserve Major General William Lyon, he offered the car during the 1996 Barrett-Jackson Auction by private treaty sale, where he refused an offer of US$11 million; the reserve was set at US$15 million.
In 1999, the new owner of the Bugatti brand, Volkswagen AG, bought the car for a reported US$20 million. Now used as a brand promotion vehicle, it travels to various museums and locations

41121 - Cabriolet Weinberger

The third car is chassis no.41121
Known as the Cabriolet Weinberger
Sold in 1932 to German obstetrician Joseph Fuchs, who specified coach builder Ludwig Weinberger of Munich to build him an open cabriolet. Painted black with yellow, the car was delivered to Dr Fuchs in May, 1932.
As political tensions rose in pre-war Germany, Fuchs, relocated to Switzerland, then Shanghai; before permanently relocating to New York around 1937, bringing the Royale with him.
Admired in Dr Fuchs' ownership by Charles Chayne, later vice-president of Corporate Engineering at General Motors. Chayne later found the car in a scrap yard in New York, buying it in 1946 for US$75. Chayne would amass an impressive collection of classic cars in the 1940s and 1950s.
Chayne first had the car running again, then he modified the car to make it more road usable and is said to have spent over US$10,000 doing so, with the completed car featuring from 1947 onwards: a brand-new intake manifold with four carburetors, instead of the original single carb setup; a new paint scheme of oyster white with a dark green trim and convertible roof
In 1957, after running the car for ten years, Chayne donated the car to the Henry Ford Museum, located in Dearborn, Michigan, USA where it is still located. The associated placard, in its entirety, reads: "1931 Bugatti Royale Type 41 Cabriolet, Ettore Bugatti, Molsheim, France, Body by Weinberger, OHC, in-line 8 cylinder, 300 horsepower, 779 cu.in. displacement, . Original price: $43,000, Gift of Charles and Esther Chayne."

41131 - Limousine Park-Ward

The fourth car is chassis no.41131
Known as the Foster car or Limousine Park-Ward
Sold to Englishman Captain Cuthbert W. Foster, heir to Eben Jordan founder of Jordan Marsh a large department store in Boston, USA, through his American mother, in 1933. Foster had a limousine body made for the car by Park Ward, created in the style of a 1921 Daimler he had once owned.
Acquired in 1946 by British Bugatti dealer Jack Lemon Burton for around £700, who was forced to replace the huge tires with ones from an artillery piece, necessitating the need to remove the skirting from the fenders.
Sold June/July 1956 to American Bugatti collector John Shakespeare, becoming part of the largest collection of Bugattis at that time. Shakespeare paid £3,500 for the car, which was in mint condition. This was a substantial price for a collector car in 1956. Two show-condition SJ Duesenbergs could be bought at the same price that year. Brand new Ferraris started around this price in 1956 as well.
Facing financial problems, in 1963 Shakespeare sold his car collection to Fritz Schlumpf
Part of the Schlumpf Collection
Resides in the Musée National de l'Automobile de Mulhouse, alongside 41100 that the brothers Schlumpf had acquired from the Bugatti estate.

41141 - Kellner car
The fifth car is chassis no.41141
Known as the Kellner car
Unsold, it was kept by Bugatti
Bricked up with 41100 and 41150 during World War II at the home of the Bugatti family in Ermenonville, to avoid being commandeered by the Nazis.
Sold together with 41150 by L'Ebe Bugatti in the Summer of 1950 to American Le Mans racer Briggs Cunningham, in return for FR₣200000, ($571 US) plus a pair of new General Electric refrigerators, then unavailable in post-war France. Note that the French franc had been drastically devalued in the years immediately following the war. The refrigerators were included out of gratuity. The car was rough but drive-able. Taking the refrigerators into account, he essentially paid about US$600 per car. Restoration costs would bring the total cost up to about 1 million Francs, or $2,858 US, per car. The cars were delivered to the States in January 1951.
After closing his museum in 1986, in 1987 the car was sold direct from Briggs Cunningham's collection by Christie's for £5.5 million or $9.7 million U.S. at the Royal Albert Hall, to Swedish property tycoon .
The car was also offered for auction in 1989 by Kruse in Las Vegas, USA. Ed Weaver bid to US$11.5 million, which was declined by Thulin as the reserve was US$15 million.
Ownership is presently unknown, but it has been shown in recent years by Swiss broker Lukas Huni.

41150 - Berline de Voyage
The sixth car is chassis no. 41150
Known as the Berline de Voyage

Unsold, it was kept by Bugatti
Bricked up with 41100 and 41141 during World War II at the home of the Bugatti family in Ermenonville, to avoid being commandeered by the Nazis.
Sold together with 41141 by L'Ebe Bugatti in the Summer of 1950 to American Le Mans racer Briggs Cunningham, in return for FR₣200,000, ($571 US) plus a pair of new General Electric refrigerators, then unavailable in post-war France. Bear in mind that the French franc had been drastically devalued in the years immediately following the war. The refrigerators were included out of gratuity. The car was rough but drive-able. Taking the refrigerators into account, he essentially paid about $600 per car. Restoration costs would bring the total cost up to about 1 million Francs, or $2,858 US, per car. The cars were delivered to the US in January 1951.
On their arrival in the United States, Cunningham sold 41150, first to Cameron Peck in early 1952 for about $6,500, (at the time one of the highest prices ever paid for a collector car, landing Cunningham a substantial profit). From there the car would eventually find its way into The Harrah Collection.The car was then sold at the 1986 Harrah auction where Houston, Texas real estate developer Jerry J. Moore paid $6.5 million for it, he kept it for 1 year and then sold it to Tom Monaghan for £5.7 million (US$8.1 million).
In 1991, Tom Monaghan, founder of Domino's Pizza, sold 41150 for US$8,000,000, which was actually less than the £5.7 million for which he purchased it in 1987 from Jerry J. Moore.
The car was sold to the Blackhawk Collection in Danville, California, where it has been on display at various times.
It was later sold by the Blackhawk Museum to an 'unknown buyer'. It is unclear if this is either Volkswagen or a Korean investor who is having it preserved in Korea.

French National Railway SNCF
To utilize the remaining 23 engines after the final Royale was built, Bugatti built a railcar powered by either two or four of the eight-cylinder units. Seventy-nine were built for the French National Railway SNCF, using a further 186 engines, the last of them remaining in regular use until 1956 or 1958 (sources differ). The railcar turned the Royale project from an economic failure into a commercial success for Bugatti. The engines were derated to produce only about 200 hp, but even in this form they provided excellent performance.

Replica cars

In light of the rarity of the Type 41 and its associated price, it is unsurprising that some replicas have been made.

The Schlumpf brothers so liked the original Dr Armand Esders coupe body on chassis 41111, using original Bugatti parts they had a replica made of the car. It now resides with the two originals they purchased at the Musée National de l'Automobile de Mulhouse.

The late Tom Wheatcroft commissioned Ashton Keynes Vintage Restorations (AKVR) to build an exact replica of Bugatti's personal car, the Coupe Napoleon (chassis number 41100), for his Donington Grand Prix Collection in England. It has since been sold and left the collection. So good was the replica, that when the Kellner car needed a replacement piston, its then Japanese owners commissioned South Cerney Engineering, part of AKVR, to provide a replacement.

On May 24, 2008, Prince Joachim of Denmark on the day of his wedding to Princess Marie (formerly Marie Cavallier) had Wheatcroft's replica waiting outside Møgeltønder Church to drive the newly married couple to Schackenborg Castle.

In 2011 a reconstruction of the 41100 Packard prototype by Dutch company Hevec Classics was presented at the Molsheim festival. It claims to use the original prototype chassis frame and other parts and was initially fitted with a replica engine (built by Tom Wheatcroft).

In 2016, the same team that reconstructed the Packard prototype, led by Frank Slopsma, unveiled a new replica of the Royale Esders Roadster at the RETRO CLASSICS show in Stuttgart, Germany.

A year later this same team showed a part-finished replica of the Weymann coach version of the 41100 Royale prototype at the Mondorf Classic Days & Concours d'Elegance. All three replicas built by the team were shown at the show, they were built for an undisclosed Dutch owner.

The Sinsheim Auto & Technik Museum has a replica of the 41100 Coupe Napoleon that was built for the 1968 film Rebus. 

The much smaller Panther De Ville (produced between 1974 and 1985) consciously resembled the Type 41.

Reunion
In the 1985 Pebble Beach Concours d'Elegance, all six cars appeared together on display.

In 2007, five of the six cars were on display at the Goodwood Festival of Speed to celebrate the Royale's eightieth anniversary.

In fiction

A Bugatti Royale features in the 2012 book Lucia on Holiday by Guy Fraser-Sampson, an addition to the Mapp and Lucia series of novels by E.F.Benson. In the story Major Mapp-Flint is asked by a maharajah to drive the car from Paris to Bellagio, but he drives so badly and inflicts so much damage that the maharajah has the car driven into Lake Como.

The Bugatti Royale 41150 Berline de Voyage 1931 also features throughout the 2014 book The Eye of Zoltar, book 3 of The Last Dragonslayer series by Jasper Fforde. The car is referenced ten times within the book. The protagonist Jennifer Strange describes her choice of car "After looking at several I'd chosen a massive vintage car called a Bugatti Royale. Inside it was sumptuously comfortable, and outside, the bonnet was so long that in misty weather it was hard to make out the hood ornament."

The Bugatti Royale features in the David Grossman book The Zigzag Kid

A blood-red Bugatti type 41 Royale Coupe de Ville appears in Leslie Charteris' Vendetta For the Saint (Doubleday 1964, ghostwritten by Harry Harrison) as a rental car for Simon Templar.

A Bugatti Royale was featured in the Clive Cussler novel "The Wrecker".

"The Seventh Royale" by Donald Stanwood is about Hitler's attempt to get a Royale and efforts to keep away from him. London auto dealer spent $9.8 million for a 1931’s bugatti royale car on Thursday, breaking records for the most expensive cost ever in the history of a car auctioneer stated. It was a Type 41 Bugatti. Christie’s auction house sold a type 41 Bugatti to a dealer Nicholas Harley.

See also
 Rolls-Royce Phantom IV, another car model devised to be sold to the royalty.

Notes

References

 

 Great Cars – Bugatti (documentary)
 Classic & Sports Car Magazine – October 1987

External links

 Bugatti Royale
 Bugatti Royale Homepage 

Royale
Luxury vehicles
Cars introduced in 1927
1930s cars